The year 1743 in science and technology involved some significant events.

Astronomy
  November 29 – Discovery of C/1743 X1, the 'Great Comet of 1744' (sic.), by Jan de Munck at Middelburg and subsequently by de Chéseaux and Klinkenberg.

Geology
 Sir Christopher Packe produces a geological map of south-east England.

Metrology
 May 19 – French physicist Jean-Pierre Christin of Lyon publishes the design of a mercury thermometer with a centigrade scale running from 0 representing the freezing point of water and 100 its boiling point.

Physiology and medicine
 June 2 – British surgeon William Hunter presents his paper "Of the structure and diseases of articulating cartilages".

Awards
 Copley Medal: Abraham Trembley

Births
 February 13 – Joseph Banks, English botanist (died 1820)
 February 28 – René Just Haüy, French mineralogist (died 1822)
 April 13 (April 2 O.S.) – Thomas Jefferson, Founding Father and 3rd President of the United States and inventor (died 1826)
 June 3 – Lucia Galeazzi Galvani, Italian scientist (died 1788)
 August 17 – Eberhard August Wilhelm von Zimmermann, German geographer and zoologist (died 1815)
 August 26 – Antoine Lavoisier, French chemist (died 1794)
 September 17 – Marquis de Condorcet, French mathematician, philosopher and political scientist (died 1794)
 October 20 – François Chopart, French surgeon (died 1795)
 November 11 – Carl Peter Thunberg, Swedish botanist (died 1828)
 December 1 – Martin Heinrich Klaproth, German chemist (died 1817)
 Elisabeth Christina von Linné, Swedish botanist  (died 1782)

Deaths

References

 
18th century in science
1740s in science